Before I Wake (1996) is a novel by Australian author John Scott. It was shortlisted for the 1997 Miles Franklin Award.

Plot summary

Jonathan Ford, haunted by his past, wanders aimlessly through Australia and Europe until he meets two sisters.

Notes

 Dedication: For Elizabeth Francis 
 The novel consists of a sequence of five novellas and features poems by Melissa Curran.

Awards and nominations

 1997 shortlisted NBC Banjo Awards — NBC Banjo Award for Fiction 
 1997 shortlisted Miles Franklin Literary Award 
 1997 shortlisted Victorian Premier's Literary Awards — The Vance Palmer Prize for Fiction

Reviews 

 Neil James in Westerly, Autumn 1997, stated "this ambitious book embraces the full narrative scope of fiction", before concluding that "John Scott has made a transition from poet to novelist similar to that made by David Malouf, Rodney Hall and Roger McDonald. He has taken with him a command of language not widely matched in Australian fiction."

References

1996 Australian novels